The first United States ambassador to Zimbabwe was appointed on May 23, 1980, after the Republic of Zimbabwe replaced the previous white-minority government of Rhodesia, and its successor Zimbabwe-Rhodesia (1979–1980).

The Republic of Zimbabwe came into being on April 18, 1980. The United States immediately recognized the new nation and moved to establish diplomatic relations. An embassy in Harare was established on April 18, 1980—independence day for Zimbabwe. Jeffrey Davidow was appointed as chargé d'affaires ad interim pending the appointment of an ambassador. The first ambassador, Robert V. Keeley, was appointed one month later on May 23, 1980.

The current U.S. Chargé d’Affaires to Zimbabwe is Elanie M. French, who is an American diplomat.

Ambassadors

See also
United States - Zimbabwe relations
Foreign relations of Zimbabwe

References

United States Department of State: Background notes on Zimbabwe

External links
 United States Department of State: Chiefs of Mission for Zimbabwe
 United States Department of State: Zimbabwe
 United States Embassy in Harare

Zimbabwe
 
United States